Redwing Airport  is a public-use airport located one nautical mile (1.852 km) south of the central business district of the Jobstown area of Burlington County, New Jersey, United States,  The airport is privately owned.

References

External links

Airports in New Jersey
Transportation in Burlington County, New Jersey